Lissorhoptrus lacustris is a species of marsh weevil in the beetle family Brachyceridae. It is found in North America.

References

Further reading

 
 

Brachyceridae
Articles created by Qbugbot
Beetles described in 1952